Benjamin Alexander Smith (born July 11, 1988) is an American professional ice hockey player currently playing for EHC Red Bull München in the Deutsche Eishockey Liga (DEL). He previously played in the National Hockey League (NHL) for the Chicago Blackhawks, San Jose Sharks, Toronto Maple Leafs and the Colorado Avalanche.

Smith was a member of the Blackhawks 2013 Stanley Cup winning team.

Playing career
As a youth, Smith played in the 2001 and 2002 Quebec International Pee-Wee Hockey Tournaments with the New York Rangers minor ice hockey team.

Smith graduated from Westminster School in 2006 and played four seasons at Boston College, helping the Eagles win two national championships. While playing for BC, Smith was drafted by the Chicago Blackhawks 169th overall in the sixth round of the 2008 NHL Entry Draft.

On October 29, 2010 the Blackhawks recalled Smith from the AHL's Rockford IceHogs to make his NHL debut in a home game against the Edmonton Oilers. He scored his first NHL goal on April 8, 2011 against Jimmy Howard of the Detroit Red Wings. On April 15, 2011, Smith scored 2 goals against the Vancouver Canucks in a 4–3 loss in only his second NHL playoff game.

On Sunday, April 24, 2011, during Game 6 of the Western Conference quarterfinals, Smith scored the overtime goal on a rebound against the Vancouver Canucks' goaltender, Roberto Luongo, to force a Game 7 in Vancouver after the Canucks had previously been leading the series 3–0. The Blackhawks ended up losing Game 7 in overtime.

On June 17, 2013, Smith was called up to play his first Stanley Cup Finals game, a 2–0 loss to the Boston Bruins, to fill in over the injured Marián Hossa. The Blackhawks won the Cup on June 24, 2013, when they defeated the Bruins in Game 6. On June 27, 2014, the Blackhawks signed him to a two-year contract extension. In the following season, Smith scored four goals in 19 playoff games to help the Blackhawks advance to the Western Conference finals.

On March 2, 2015, Smith was traded by the Blackhawks to the San Jose Sharks in exchange for Andrew Desjardins. He scored his first goal with the Sharks the same day in their shutout game against the Montreal Canadiens, but remained for most of the season with the Sharks' AHL affiliate San Jose Barracuda.

On February 27, 2016, Smith, Alex Stalock and a conditional 4th round pick in 2018 were traded by the Sharks to the Toronto Maple Leafs in exchange for James Reimer and Jeremy Morin.

Despite putting up acceptable numbers with the Maple Leafs, Smith was placed on waivers by the team on March 30, 2016. Smith cleared the following day and was assigned to the Toronto Marlies of the AHL. Despite being considered to be favourites to win the Calder Cup, the Marlies were eliminated in the third round of the playoffs, with Smith contributing nine points in their fifteen-game run.

On August 16, 2016, he signed a one-year, two-way deal with the Colorado Avalanche, worth $675,000 at the NHL level and $150,000 at the AHL level. Having made the Avalanche opening night roster, Smith made his debut with Colorado to start the 2016–17 season in a 6–5 victory over the Dallas Stars on October 15, 2016. Smith would play in four scoreless games for the Avalanche before being placed on waivers and being claimed by the Toronto Maple Leafs on October 24, 2016. Smith was claimed due to the depth he provided the team on the penalty kill, a position coach Mike Babcock praised him for during his stint the previous season in Toronto.

In the 2017–18 season, he won the Calder Cup with the Toronto Marlies, serving as team captain. On June 15, 2018, he signed with Adler Mannheim of the German DEL.

After a second stint with Adler Mannheim, Smith remained in the DEL, agreeing to a one-year contract with EHC München on May 10, 2021.

Personal life 
Smith was born in Winston-Salem, North Carolina, and raised in Avon, Connecticut. Smith is the first player born in the state of North Carolina to have his name engraved on the Stanley Cup.

Smith's younger brother played Division I soccer for William & Mary. His uncle is Canadian conductor Peter Oundjian.

Career statistics

Regular season and playoffs

International

Awards and honors

On May 2, 2017, Smith agreed to a one-year extension to remain with the Maple Leafs.

References

External links

1988 births
Living people
Adler Mannheim players
American men's ice hockey right wingers
Boston College Eagles men's ice hockey players
Chicago Blackhawks draft picks
Chicago Blackhawks players
Colorado Avalanche players
Ice hockey players from Connecticut
Ice hockey people from North Carolina
EHC München players
People from Avon, Connecticut
Sportspeople from Hartford County, Connecticut
Rockford IceHogs (AHL) players
Rögle BK players
San Jose Barracuda players
San Jose Sharks players
Sportspeople from Winston-Salem, North Carolina
Stanley Cup champions
Toronto Maple Leafs players
Toronto Marlies players